The Ogba people are one of the ethnic groups in Rivers state. The Ogba people speak Ogba an Igboid dialect. The Ogbas reside in a local government called Ogba-Egbema-Ndoni in Rivers state Nigeria. The Ogba language has three dialects namely; Usomini, Igburu, Egi dialect. The Ogba kingdom is made up of three clans which includes; Egi, Igburu, Usomini clans, and its largest urban town is Omoku. Ogba people speak two dialects of the Ogba languages, the Egi and Igburu. Eligbo and Ukporomini are two Ogba communities in Ahaoda East Local Government Area, while Itu II in Emohua LGA also speaks Ogba language.

The entire Ogba culture is similar to that of Benin Kingdom as the people of ogba claim their origins from Benin Kingdom. The Oba of Ogba land draw respect and pledge allegiance to Oba of Benin which marks the long history of the dynasty.

History
The Ogbas are one of the migrants from Bini empire with Akalaka a Bini prince as their ancestor, situated in the lower basin of River Niger, in the modern Rivers State of Nigeria. This history of the community, written by its current Eze (king), sets out to cover the entire sweep of its history, from ‘the origin of the Ogbas’ (attributed to the fourteenth century) to the colonial period (post-independence history being treated only cursorily). It is based mainly on local oral traditions, taken partly from colonial Intelligence Reports, but also including extensive new material collected by the author; some use is also made, for the colonial period, of contemporary documents from British and Nigerian archives, and for prehistory, of archaeological evidence.Igbo. The Ogba people comprise fourteen extended families divided into clans, and occupy an area of about 600 km in the Niger flood plain. This study covers their origins, environment, political, economic and social institutions, and cultural practices. It also considers the impact of colonialism and the activities of the Christian missionaries on the Ogba, in the context of the various ethnic groups in Nigeria thus affected. It argues that although the Ogba lost much under colonial rule, their resilience and adaptability, in common with many Nigerian ethnic groups was the key to their cultural renewal and adaptation to the modern era. The author further suggests that rather than perceiving Nigerian history as a series of micro- histories of different ethnic groups, it is closer to the truth to understand Nigeria as a loose associations of people with a common history and common cultural traits - all to the good, given their common destiny.

Politics  
The Ogba people are ruled by the Oba (Eze Ogba) of Ogba land. His Eminence Barr. Nwachukwu Nnam Obi III.

References

Igbo subgroups
Indigenous peoples of Rivers State